The 2018–19 NIFL Premiership (known as the Danske Bank Premiership for sponsorship reasons) was the 11th season of Northern Ireland's highest national football league in this format since its inception in 2008, the 118th season of Irish league football overall, and the sixth season of the league operating as part of the Northern Ireland Football League. The season began on 4 August 2018 and concluded on 27 April 2019, with the play-offs for promotion/relegation and the Europa League then taking place in May 2019. 

Crusaders were the defending champions from the previous season. However, they were unable to defend their title, finishing in fourth place. Linfield were the eventual champions, lifting the league title for the second time in three seasons, and stretching their record tally of title wins to 53 overall. The Blues were confirmed as the champions on 13 April 2019, following a 0–0 draw at home against the outgoing champions, Crusaders, which left Linfield 12 points clear at the top of the table, with only three games remaining and nine points left to play for.

For the second successive season, two clubs suffered relegation to the NIFL Championship. Newry City finished bottom of the table, and were relegated to the 2019–20 NIFL Championship after only one season in the top flight. Eleventh-placed Ards faced 2018–19 NIFL Championship runners-up, Carrick Rangers, in a two-legged promotion/relegation play-off. Carrick Rangers won the tie 3–1 on aggregate to secure promotion and relegate Ards. This brought an end to Ards' three-season stay in the top flight, and meant an immediate return to the Premiership for Carrick Rangers after only one season in the Championship.

Premiership champions Linfield entered the 2019–20 UEFA Champions League, with the runners-up (Ballymena United) and the play-off winners (Cliftonville) entering the 2019–20 UEFA Europa League along with the 2018–19 Irish Cup winners, Crusaders. Linfield also qualified to take part in the newly introduced Champions Cup against the 2019 League of Ireland Premier Division champions, Dundalk.

Teams
Twelve teams competed in the 2018–19 NIFL Premiership, ten of which retained their Premiership status from the previous season. Ballinamallard United were relegated to the 2018–19 NIFL Championship after finishing bottom of the 2017–18 NIFL Premiership, and were replaced by Institute as winners of the 2017–18 NIFL Championship.

Carrick Rangers finished in the promotion-relegation play-off place, and lost their Premiership place after losing the play-off 6–3 on aggregate against Championship runners-up Newry City.

Stadia and locations

League table

Results

Matches 1–22
During matches 1–22 each team played every other team twice (home and away).

Matches 23–33
During matches 23–33 each team played every other team for the third time (either at home, or away).

Matches 34–38
During matches 34–38 each team will play every other team in their half of the table once. As this is the fourth time that teams play each other this season, home sides are chosen so that they will have played each other twice at home and twice away.

Section A

Section B

Play-offs

UEFA Europa League play-offs
Four of the teams (Crusaders qualified for the Europa League directly as 2018–19 Irish Cup winners) that finished in the play-off places (3rd–7th position) participated in the Europa League play-offs to decide which team would qualify for the 2019–20 UEFA Europa League preliminary round. After victories over Coleraine and Glenavon in the semi-finals respectively, Cliftonville and Glentoran once again contested the final, with Cliftonville securing the last remaining place in next season's Europa League after a 2–0 win. This was a repeat of the 2016 and 2018 play-off finals, with Cliftonville winning 3–2 on both previous occasions.

Semi-finals

Final

Cliftonville won the Europa League play-offs, and qualified for the 2019–20 UEFA Europa League preliminary round.

NIFL Premiership play-offs

Pre play-off
The 2018–19 NIFL Championship runners-up, Carrick Rangers, took part in a Championship promotion pre play-off match against the 3rd-placed team, Portadown, with Carrick Rangers given home advantage as the higher-ranked of the two clubs. Carrick Rangers won the match 2–0 and advanced to the two-legged play-off against the 11th-placed NIFL Premiership team, Ards, for the last remaining place in the 2019–20 NIFL Premiership. The pre play-off match was played on 30 April 2019.

Play-off
The 11th-placed Premiership team, Ards, played a two-legged tie against the pre play-off winners, Carrick Rangers, with Ards given the advantage of playing the second leg at home as the Premiership club. Carrick Rangers won the tie 3–1 on aggregate to secure promotion to the 2019–20 NIFL Premiership, with Ards being relegated to the Championship. The matches took place on 3 May and 6 May 2019.

Carrick Rangers won 3–1 on aggregate, and were promoted to the 2019–20 NIFL Premiership. Ards were relegated to the 2019–20 NIFL Championship.

Top goalscorers

References

External links

NIFL Premiership seasons
Northern Ireland
2018–19 in Northern Ireland association football